Leptocarpus may refer to:
 Leptocarpus (crustacean), a genus of shrimps in the family Palaemonidae
 Leptocarpus (plant), a genus of flowering plants in the family Restionaceae